is a private women's junior college in the city of Toyoake in Aichi Prefecture, Japan.  Although actually in Toyoake, the school is very close to the city of Nagoya.  The predecessor of the school, a women's school, was founded in 1923, and it was chartered as a junior college in 1955.

References

External links 
 Nagoya College 

Educational institutions established in 1923
Private universities and colleges in Japan
Universities and colleges in Aichi Prefecture
Japanese junior colleges
Toyoake, Aichi
1923 establishments in Japan